The Camiguin Polytechnic State College is a public college in the Philippines.  It is mandated to provide higher professional, technical and special instructions for special purposes and to promote research and extension services, advanced studies and progressive leadership in agriculture, forestry, engineering, arts and sciences, and other relevant studies.  Its main campus is located in Mambajao, Camiguin.

References

State universities and colleges in the Philippines
Universities and colleges in Camiguin
Educational institutions established in 1995
1995 establishments in the Philippines